Gaspar Andrés Servio (born March 9, 1992 in Buenos Aires, Argentina) is a professional Argentine footballer who currently plays for Rosario Central, on loan from Club Guaraní.

Honours
Cafetaleros de Tapachula
 Ascenso MX: Clausura 2018

References

External links

1992 births
Living people
Argentine footballers
Argentine expatriate footballers
Footballers from Buenos Aires
Association football goalkeepers
Argentine Primera División players
Primera Nacional players
Ascenso MX players
Paraguayan Primera División players
Club Atlético River Plate footballers
Club Atlético Banfield footballers
Independiente Rivadavia footballers
Arsenal de Sarandí footballers
Dorados de Sinaloa footballers
Cafetaleros de Chiapas footballers
Club Guaraní players
Rosario Central footballers
Argentine expatriate sportspeople in Mexico
Argentine expatriate sportspeople in Paraguay
Expatriate footballers in Mexico
Expatriate footballers in Paraguay